The women's long jump event  at the 1994 European Athletics Indoor Championships was held in Palais Omnisports de Paris-Bercy on 11 March.

Medalists

Results

Qualification
Qualification performance: 6.40 (Q) or at least 12 best performers (q) advanced to the final.

Final

References

Final results
Qualification results

Long jump at the European Athletics Indoor Championships
Long
1994 in women's athletics